Hermiona Asachi (surname also spelled Asaki; December 16, 1821 – December 9, 1900) was a Romanian writer and translator.

Life
Hermiona was born Glicheria Melirato, the daughter of Kiriaco Melirato and Elena Teyber. She was later adopted by Gheorghe Asachi, her mother's second husband.

Hermiona translated texts by Silvio Pellico and Benjamin Franklin into Romanian for her father's publication Albina Românească. In 1845, she moved to France, where she corresponded with various French intellectuals such as Victor Hugo, Jules Michelet and Louis Blanc.

In 1852, she married the French historian Edgar Quinet, She edited some of Quinet's texts for publication, subsequently publishing under the name Hermiona Quinet.

Asachi died in Paris at the age of 78.

Works

Literary translations
 René-Paul și Paul-René, translation of the short story by Émile Deschamps (1839)
 Ruth, poems by Caroline Pichler (1839)
 Istoria sfântă pentru tinerimea moldo-română (Sacred history for young Moldavians and Romanians) (1840)
 Despre îndatoririle oamenilor (On the duties of men), by Silvio Pellico (1843)

Edgar Quinet
Works published from Edgar Quinet's notes, manuscripts, and notebooks. Many were selected, annotated, prefaced, and arranged by Hermione.
 Mémoires d'exil (1869)
 Paris, journal du siège (1873)
 Sentiers de France (1875)
 Le livre de l'exilé, 1851-1870; Après l'exil, manifestes et discours, 1871-1875 (1875)
 Vie et mort du génie grec (1876)
 Lettres à sa mère (1877)
 Histoire de mes idées (1878)
 Lettres d’exil à Michelet et à divers amis (1885-6) (4 volumes)
 Edgar Quinet avant et depuis l'exil (1887-9)
 Cinquante ans d'amitié, Michelet-Quinet (1899)

Other works
 Le Vrai dans l'éducation (1891)
 Ce que dit la musique (1893)
 La France idéale (1896)
 De Paris à Édimbourg (1898)

Notes

References

1821 births
1900 deaths
Austrian adoptees
Romanian people of Austrian descent
Romanian nobility
Romanian women writers
Romanian translators
19th-century translators
19th-century Romanian women